Eshgaft-e Baraftab (also Romanized as Eshgaft-e Barāftāb; also known as Eshkaft-e Barāftāb) is a village in Jastun Shah Rural District, Hati District, Lali County, Khuzestan Province, Iran. At the 2006 census, its population was 146, in 25 families.

References 

Populated places in Lali County